Rudolf Sausgruber is an Austrian retired slalom canoeist who competed in the early-to-mid 1950s. He won three medals at the ICF Canoe Slalom World Championships with a gold (Folding K-1 team: 1953), a silver (Folding K-1: 1953) and a bronze (Folding K-1: 1951).

References

Austrian male canoeists
Possibly living people
Year of birth missing
Medalists at the ICF Canoe Slalom World Championships